United States gubernatorial elections were held in 1916, in 36 states, concurrent with the House, Senate elections and presidential election, on November 7, 1916 (September 11 in Maine).

In New Mexico, the governor was elected to a two-year term for the first time, instead of a four-year term. In Arkansas and Georgia, the gubernatorial election was held on the same day as federal elections for the first time, having previously been held in September and October, respectively.

Results

See also 
1916 United States elections
1916 United States presidential election
1916 United States Senate elections
1916 United States House of Representatives elections

References

Notes 

 
November 1916 events